The Kathi people is a small group of clans found in the peninsular Kathiawar (now called Saurashtra) region of Gujarat, western India. It was from the Kathis that the Maratha Empire and later the British Raj named the Saurashtra region as Kathiawar until it was renamed Saurashtra, as the Kathis were prominent there during the 17th-18th centuries. According to A. M. Shah, Kathis are a peasant caste.

Their kuladevatā is the Sun. According to tradition, a Kāṭhī called Vāloji fled from Pāvāgaḍh. He defeated Jām Abdā of Thān with the help of the Sun god, and in return Vāloji repaired the sun temple on Kandolā Hill (originally built by Māndhātā in Satya Yuga. Vāloji's daughter Sonabāi became the priestess of the temple, and married Vālerā Jālu. Sonabāi's descendants, known as Bhagats, form the main sun-worshipping strand of Kāṭhīs.

There are several branches of Kāṭhīs, including Vaḷā, Sakhāyat, Khumān, Khācar, and Auratiya. The Vaḷā Kāṭhīs were formed when a Vaḷā Rājput married a Kāṭhī woman. The Auratiyas were formed on another occasion when Rājputs married Kāṭhi women. Historically, Kāṭhī women were known to marry Rājput men; however, marriages with Āhirs and Bābariās were more common.

The Kathis practiced the partition of territory upon a rulers death, in which his territory would be carved out among his sons. However, the British encourage the practice of primogeniture, in which a ruler's territory would be completely inherited by his eldest son (or whomever was next in succession). The British favored this practice because it was easier to maintain control over a few large states rather than hundreds of small ones. However by the late 1920s, only a few Kathi rulers had adopted primogeniture. Government of India has added them in Other Backward Class in the central list of Gujarat due to their educational backwardness.

Culture
Kathi people are horse lovers and keep Kathiawari horses, which are known worldwide.

References 
6. Books of The History of Kathiawad from the Earliest Times by Captain Wilberforce-Bell 

Indian castes